Michael Aston (born 4 May 1961) is the founder and current leader of the U.S. incarnation of Gene Loves Jezebel.

In 1989, Aston left Gene Loves Jezebel over his unhappiness with the direction of the band and strained relations with his twin brother, Jay. Moving to California, Aston started the Immigrants, which eventually became Edith Grove. The band released its only album to rave reviews. Aston wrote and released his first solo album, called Why Me Why This Why Now?. He rejoined Gene Loves Jezebel instead of writing and recording a new Edith Grove album.

The Gene Loves Jezebel name 
After Aston's version of Gene Loves Jezebel disbanded in 1993, between 1993 and 1997 Michael and Jay Aston reformed Gene Loves Jezebel and recorded material that would eventually become VII. From February 1997 to October 1997, the band toured with a new lineup. Another bitter dispute between the brothers ensued. According to Michael Aston, he refused to be pushed out of the band after all of the work that he had put into the reunion and reformed Gene Loves Jezebel with the band used on the first 1997 Pre-Raphaelite Brothers tour. This caused much confusion for fans. Jay sued Michael to stop him from using the Gene Loves Jezebel name.

A Los Angeles judge denied twice the injunctions that were intended to stop Michael from using the Gene Loves Jezebel name. Jay withdrew the case with prejudice, meaning that he could never sue Michael again. Jay released the VII album in 1998. He had erased Michael's vocals from the album and did not include Michael in the credits, but a copy of the album with Michael's vocals was released as The Doghouse Sessions.

Michael Aston filed a request for the Gene Loves Jezebel trademark, which he was granted in September 2002, and ICANN awarded Michael the genelovesjezebel.com domain name.

References

External links 
 Official site
 

Gothic rock musicians
Living people
Welsh expatriates in the United States
Welsh twins
1957 births
Welsh new wave musicians
Gene Loves Jezebel members